Bratslav (Brotslev, today also pronounced Breslev or Breslov as the name of a Hasidic group, which originated from this town) is an urban-type settlement in Ukraine, located in Tulchyn Raion of Vinnytsia Oblast, by the Southern Bug river. It is a medieval European city and a regional center of the Eastern Podolia region (see Bratslav Voivodeship) founded by government of the Crown of the Kingdom of Poland, which dramatically lost its importance during the 19th-20th centuries. Population:

History

The first written mention of Bratslav dates back to 1362. City status was granted Magdeburg Rights in 1564. Bratslav belonged to the Grand Duchy of Lithuania until the Lublin Union of 1569, when it became a voivodeship center in the Crown of the Kingdom of Poland as part of the Polish–Lithuanian Commonwealth.

In the early 16th century, the Starosta of Bratslav and Vinnytsia (Winnica) was Hetman Kostiantyn Ostrozky, who commanded Polish–Lithuanian army in the Battle of Orsha. Nevertheless, Ostrozky was unable to protect Bratslav and its castle from destruction in 1497, when the town was raided by Crimean Tatars. The castle was rebuilt and reinforced by order of Polish King Alexander I Jagiellon, but it was destroyed once again, in 1551, during a Tatar raid commanded by Khan Devlet I Giray, after which Bratslav turned into a desert.

In 1564, Bratslav was granted Magdeburg rights, and five years later, following the Union of Lublin, it was annexed by the Kingdom of Poland, becoming capital of the Bratslav Voivodeship, which existed for over 200 years. During this time, Bratslav (then named Bracław in Polish) by the authorities, was property of Polish kings, and was ruled by the starostas.

In 1570, a special commission of the Polish Sejm marked boundaries of the Bratslav Voivodeship. In the west, it reached the Dniestr and the Murachwa rivers, in the north it went along the so-called Black Tatar Trail. With top-quality soil, the so-called chernozem, Bracław Voivodeship was the most fertile region of Polish–Lithuanian Commonwealth. In 1589 in Warsaw, the Sejm granted coat of arms to the town: a cross in red field, with blue shield in the middle. In 1598, Polish Parliamend decided to move the seat of local courts and sejmiks from Bratslav to Vinnytsia, and as a result, Winnica became a de facto capital of the voivodeship, even though it was still named after Bracław.

On October 5, 1594, Zaporozhian Cossacks under Severyn Nalyvaiko murdered near Bratslav Castle a tabor of the local Polish nobility, who tried to escape the Nalyvaiko Uprising. In 1648, during the Bohdan Khmelnytsky rebellion, Bracław became a Cossack regimental city, part of the Ukrainian Hetman state, which was later assimilated by the Tsardom of Russia. In 1667, under the Treaty of Andrusiv, Russia returned the city to Poland. The city was ruled by the Ottoman Empire between 1672-1699, returning then to Poland once more. It became part of the Russian Empire after the Second Partition of Poland in 1793, along with the rest of the formerly Polish Right-bank Ukraine. Under Russia, Bratslav was an uyezd (district) center in the Podolia governorate. As the city had no access to a railroad, its importance and population gradually declined.

Bratslav is famous in Judaism as the place where Rabbi Nachman lived and taught between 1802 and 1810. Rabbi Nachman was the founder of one of the major branches of Hasidism, Breslover Hasidism, and an author of Jewish mystical works. After the 1917 revolution Judaism had been strongly persecuted. The history of this persecution is well illustrated by the life of Bratslav rabbi Moishe Yankel Rabinovich who served as a rabbi from 1919 to 1968.

In 1926 Bratslav had a population of 7,842 (Source=Columbia-Lippincott Gazetteer).

During World War II, Bratslav was occupied by German and Romanian armies on July 22, 1941, and was made into a ghetto for Jews of Bratslav and its vicinities. According to Romanian reports, there were 747 Jews in Bratslav in the end of December 1941. On January 1, 1942, most Jews were transferred to an extermination camp, and 50 people were drowned in the South Bug river. Two labor camps for German construction companies Todt-Dorman and Horst und Jessen were opened in August 1942. They hosted about 1,200 Jews deported from Romania, as well as about 300 Ukrainian Jews. The labor schedule was designed to exhaust all prisoners: work in masonry, without days off, from dawn till dusk, with a 30-minute lunch break. On September 23, 1942, all elderly and children were shot in a neighboring forest. The executions continued regularly after that date. In April 1943, Todt-Dorman camp was closed, and the prisoners were transferred to Horst und Jessen. Bratslav was part of Transnistria Governorate in Kingdom of Romania till its liberation in 17 March 1944 by Red Army.

People from Bratslav 
 Ivan Bohun — Ukrainian Cossack
 Ivan Volosheniuk — a Ukrainian writer.

References

Sources 
  Елена Цвелик, "Еврейская Атлантида", M-Graphics Publishing, Boston, MA.

External links
 Bratslav - Encyclopedia of Ukraine
 Bratslav voivodeship in the Encyclopedia of Ukraine
 Bratslav region in the Encyclopedia of Ukraine
 Jewish Encyclopedia
 Bratslav fortress
 The murder of the Jews of Bratslav during World War II, at Yad Vashem website.

 
Urban-type settlements in Tulchyn Raion
Bratslav Voivodeship
Cossack Hetmanate
Bratslavsky Uyezd
Breslov Hasidism
Historic Jewish communities in Ukraine
Shtetls
Holocaust locations in Ukraine
Historic Jewish communities in Poland
Jewish communities destroyed in the Holocaust